Di Morrissey  (born Grace Diane Cairns, 1943) is a best-selling Australian novelist.

Early life
Di Morrissey was born in 1943 to Kay and Len Cairns in Wingham, New South Wales, named Grace Diane Cairns. At the age of five, she moved with her family to the remote surrounds of Pittwater, north of Sydney. As a child, she counted famous Australian actor Chips Rafferty as a close mentor and friend, who helped provide for her and her mother after the death of her stepfather and half-brother when she was a child and helped raise funds to send them overseas to California to live with family.

Her mother, Kay Roberts, became Australia's first female commercial TV director working at Artransa Studios, Australian Film Commission and Film Australia.

Career
Although wanting to be a novelist since she was a young girl, Morrissey started writing as a cadet on The Australian Women's Weekly magazine at age 17. Later she worked as a journalist on Northcliffe Newspapers on London's Fleet Street for several years.

She then married US diplomat Peter Morrissey and lived in Hawaii, where she had her own morning TV show for KGMB and appeared in several episodes of the CBS TV series Hawaii Five-O, starring Jack Lord. The couple lived in various countries in South East Asia and Guyana before Morrissey returned to Australia on her own. She became one of the original presenters on Australia's first national current affairs Breakfast TV show, Good Morning Australia, with Gordon Elliott, which premiered on Network Ten in 1981.

In 1989 she left TV to write her first novel, Heart of the Dreaming, which was published in 1991 and became a best-seller, establishing a demand for Australian-based stories.

She is an environmentalist and activist. All her novels are inspired by landscape with environmental, political and cultural issues woven into mass market popular fiction. Following her support of Aung Sang Suu Kyi, she travelled to Burma (Myanmar) in 2011 and published her book The Golden Land in 2012. She has subsequently established The Golden Land Education Foundation and raises funds for the school she has established outside Mandalay.

In 2015 she launched The Manning Community News, a monthly newspaper covering local news in the Manning Valley, New South Wales.

Awards and honours 
In May 2017 Morrissey was inducted into the Australian Book Industry Awards (ABIA) Hall of Fame, and given the Lloyd O’Neil Award for service to the Australian book industry, presented by her old friend and fellow author Tom Keneally.

Morrissey was made a Member of the Order of Australia (AM) in the 2019 Queen's Birthday Honours in recognition of her "significant service to literature as a novelist, and to conservation and the environment".

Bibliography

Heart of the Dreaming 1991
The Last Rose of Summer 1992
Follow The Morning Star 1993
The Last Mile Home 1994
Tears of The Moon 1995
When The Singing Stops 1996
The Songmaster 1997
Scatter The Stars 1998
Blaze 1999
The Bay 2001
Kimberley Sun 2002
Barra Creek 2003
The Reef 2004
The Valley 2006
Monsoon 2007
The Islands 2008
The Silent Country 2009
The Plantation 2010
The Opal Desert 2011
The Golden Land 2012
The Winter Sea 2013
The Road Back 2014
Rain Music 2015
A Distant Journey 2016
The Red Coast 2017
Arcadia 2018
The Last Paradise 2019
Before the Storm 2020
The Night Tide 2022

Children's books 
Buster and the Queen Bee (Angus and Robertson) 2000
Sonoma Meets Miss Mouse (Harbour Publishing) 2014
Everton and Will (Harbour Publishing) 2015
Surfer Boy Bo (Harbour Publishing) 2016
Ula's Magic Island (Harbour Publishing) 2017

References

External links

National Library of Australia catalogue listing
The Golden Land Education Foundation
The Manning Community News

1948 births
Living people
20th-century Australian novelists
21st-century Australian novelists
Australian children's writers
Australian women novelists
20th-century Australian women writers
21st-century Australian women writers
Members of the Order of Australia